The Toronto Wellingtons were one of the first amateur men's ice hockey teams in Toronto, Ontario, Canada. They were active around 1900, and are notable for challenging for the Stanley Cup as Ontario Hockey Association (OHA) senior champions of 1901.

Seasons
The Wellingtons were organized in 1895 under the jurisdiction of the Ontario Hockey Association (OHA). The club fielded a junior ice hockey team from 1895–1898. The club fielded a team in the intermediate level from 1896–1934. It fielded teams at the senior ice hockey level of the OHA from 1899 to 1903. The senior teams were the J. Ross Robertson Cup champions from 1900 to 1903. Journalist W. A. Hewitt served as the team's representative at meetings of the OHA.

Stanley Cup challenge
As 1901 champions of the Ontario Hockey Association, the Wellingtons were eligible to challenge for the Stanley Cup. In January 1902, the Wellingtons travelled to Winnipeg, Manitoba to play the Winnipeg Victorias for the Stanley Cup.

See also
List of Stanley Cup champions

References

Defunct ice hockey teams in Canada
We
Ice hockey teams in Ontario